London Community may refer to:

London Community Credit Union, a savings and loans co-operative, based in Bethnal Green
London Community Cricket Association, trading as Cricket for Change (C4C)
London Community Gospel Choir, founded in 1982

See also
London LGBT+ Community Pride, a community interest company formed to deliver Pride in London
London Road Community Hospital, a hospital in Derby